Feigen is a surname. Notable people with the surname include:

Brenda Feigen (born 1944), American activist, film producer, lawyer and writer
Jimmy Feigen (born 1989), American swimmer
Marc Feigen (born 1961), American chief executive
Richard L. Feigen (1930–2021), American art dealer